Marco Aurélio Pereira Alves, known simply as Marquinho  (born 20 February 1982 in Machado, Minas Gerais), is a Brazilian attacking midfielder. He last played for Boavista Sport Club. He has played professionally for a number of clubs in Brazil as well as stints in Chile and The Netherlands.

Honours
Dutch Championship: 2000, 2001
Carioca Championship: 2005

Contract
Vasco (Loan) 1 January 2008 to 30 June 2008
Tombense 26 June 2007 to 25 June 2010

References

External links
 CBF
 netvasco.com.br
 websoccerclub
 vi.nl

1982 births 
Living people
Brazilian footballers
Brazilian expatriate footballers
Club Alianza Lima footballers
PSV Eindhoven players
Fluminense FC players
Paysandu Sport Club players
Clube Atlético Mineiro players
Guarani FC players
CR Vasco da Gama players
Tombense Futebol Clube players
Fortaleza Esporte Clube players
Brasiliense Futebol Clube players
Sur SC players
Dibba Al-Hisn Sports Club players
Khor Fakkan Sports Club players
UAE First Division League players
Eredivisie players
Expatriate footballers in the Netherlands
Expatriate footballers in Peru
Association football midfielders